The 2022–23 Washington Capitals season is the 49th season for the National Hockey League franchise that was established on June 11, 1974.

Standings

Divisional standings

Conference standings

Schedule and results

Regular season 
The regular season schedule was released on July 6, 2022. 

|- style="background:#fcc;"
| 1 || October 12 || Boston Bruins || 2–5 || || Kuemper || 18,573 || 0–1–0 || 0 || 
|- style="background:#fcc;"
| 2 || October 13 || @ Toronto Maple Leafs || 2–3 || || Lindgren || 18,914 || 0–2–0 || 0 || 
|- style="background:#cfc;"
| 3 || October 15 || Montreal Canadiens || 3–1 || || Kuemper || 18,573 || 1–2–0 || 2 || 
|- style="background:#cfc;"
| 4 || October 17 || Vancouver Canucks || 6–4 || || Kuemper || 18,573 || 2–2–0 || 4 || 
|- style="background:#fcc;"
| 5 || October 20 || @ Ottawa Senators || 2–5 ||  || Kuemper || 14,210 || 2–3–0 || 4 || 
|- style="background:#cfc;"
| 6 || October 22 || Los Angeles Kings || 4–3 || || Kuemper || 18,573 || 3–3–0 || 6 || 
|- style="background:#cfc;"
| 7 || October 24 || @ New Jersey Devils || 6–3 || || Lindgren || 11,405 || 4–3–0 || 8 || 
|- style="background:#fcc;"
| 8 || October 27 || @ Dallas Stars || 0–2 || || Kuemper || 18,235 || 4–4–0 || 8 || 
|- style="background:#cfc;"
| 9 || October 29 || @ Nashville Predators || 3–0 || || Kuemper || 17,159 || 5–4–0 || 10 || 
|- style="background:#fff;"
| 10 || October 31 || @ Carolina Hurricanes || 2–3 || SO || Kuemper || 16,211 || 5–4–1 || 11 || 
|-

|- style="background:#fff;"
| 11 || November 1 || Vegas Golden Knights || 2–3 || OT || Lindgren || 18,573 || 5–4–2 || 12 || 
|- style="background:#fcc;"
| 12 || November 3 || @ Detroit Red Wings || 1–3 || || Kuemper || 18,527 || 5–5–2 || 12 || 
|- style="background:#fcc;"
| 13 || November 5 || Arizona Coyotes || 2–3 || || Kuemper || 18,573 || 5–6–2 || 12 || 
|- style="background:#cfc;"
| 14 || November 7 || Edmonton Oilers || 5–4 || || Lindgren || 18,573 || 6–6–2 || 14 || 
|- style="background:#fcc;"
| 15 || November 9 || Pittsburgh Penguins || 1–4 || || Kuemper || 18,573 || 6–7–2 || 14 || 
|- style="background:#cfc;"
| 16 || November 11 || Tampa Bay Lightning || 5–1 || || Kuemper || 18,573 || 7–7–2 || 16 || 
|- style="background:#fcc;"
| 17 || November 13 || @ Tampa Bay Lightning || 3–6 || || Kuemper || 19,092 || 7–8–2 || 16 || 
|- style="background:#fcc;"
| 18 || November 15 || @ Florida Panthers || 2–5 || || Kuemper || 13,813 || 7–9–2 || 16 || 
|- style="background:#fff;"
| 19 || November 17 || @ St. Louis Blues || 4–5 || SO || Lindgren || 18,096 || 7–9–3 || 17 || 
|- style="background:#fcc;"
| 20 || November 19 || Colorado Avalanche || 0–4 || || Kuemper || 18,573 || 7–10–3 || 17 || 
|- style="background:#cfc;"
| 21 || November 23 || Philadelphia Flyers || 3–2 || OT || Kuemper || 18,573 || 8–10–3 || 19 || 
|- style="background:#cfc;"
| 22 || November 25 || Calgary Flames || 3–0 || || Kuemper || 18,573 || 9–10–3 || 21 || 
|- style="background:#fcc;"
| 23 || November 26 || @ New Jersey Devils || 1–5 || || Lindgren || 16,514 || 9–11–3 || 21 || 
|- style="background:#cfc;"
| 24 || November 29 || @ Vancouver Canucks || 5–1 || || Kuemper || 18,179 || 10–11–3 || 23 || 
|-

|- style="background:#fff;"
| 25 || December 1 || @ Seattle Kraken || 2–3 || OT || Kuemper || 17,151 || 10–11–4 || 24 || 
|- style="background:#fcc;"
| 26 || December 3 || @ Calgary Flames || 2–5 || || Lindgren || 18,698 || 10–12–4 || 24 || 
|- style="background:#cfc;"
| 27 || December 5 || @ Edmonton Oilers || 3–2 || || Lindgren || 17,264 || 11–12–4 || 26 || 
|- style="background:#cfc;"
| 28 || December 7 || @ Philadelphia Flyers || 4–1 || || Lindgren || 16,826 || 12–12–4 || 28 || 
|- style="background:#cfc;"
| 29 || December 9 || Seattle Kraken || 4–1 || || Lindgren || 18,573 || 13–12–4 || 30 || 
|- style="background:#cfc;"
| 30 || December 11 || @ Winnipeg Jets || 5–2 || || Lindgren || 14,096 || 14–12–4 || 32 || 
|- style="background:#cfc;"
| 31 || December 13 || @ Chicago Blackhawks || 7–3 || || Lindgren || 16,181 || 15–12–4 || 34 || 
|- style="background:#fcc;"
| 32 || December 15 || Dallas Stars || 1–2 || || Lindgren || 18,573 || 15–13–4 || 34 || 
|- style="background:#cfc;"
| 33 || December 17 || Toronto Maple Leafs || 5–2 || || Lindgren || 18,573 || 16–13–4 || 36 || 
|- style="background:#cfc;"
| 34 || December 19 || Detroit Red Wings || 4–3 || OT || Lindgren || 18,573 || 17–13–4 || 38 || 
|- style="background:#cfc;"
| 35 || December 22 || @ Ottawa Senators || 3–2 || OT || Kuemper || 17,231 || 18–13–4 || 40 || 
|- style="background:#cfc;"
| 36 || December 23 || Winnipeg Jets || 4–1 || || Lindgren || 18,573 || 19–13–4 || 42 || 
|- style="background:#cfc;"
| 37 || December 27 || @ New York Rangers || 4–0 || || Kuemper || 18,006 || 20–13–4 || 44 || 
|- style="background:#fff;"
| 38 || December 29 || Ottawa Senators || 3–4 || OT || Kuemper || 18,573 || 20–13–5 || 45 || 
|- style="background:#cfc;"
| 39 || December 31 || Montreal Canadiens || 9–2 || || Lindgren || 18,573 || 21–13–5 || 47 || 
|-

|- style="background:#fff;"
| 40 || January 3 || Buffalo Sabres || 4–5 || OT || Kuemper || 18,573 || 21–13–6 || 48 || 
|- style="background:#cfc;"
| 41 || January 5 || @ Columbus Blue Jackets || 6–2 || || Kuemper || 17,924 || 22–13–6 || 50 || 
|- style="background:#fcc;"
| 42 || January 6 || Nashville Predators || 2–3 || || Lindgren || 18,573 || 22–14–6 || 50 || 
|- style="background:#cfc;"
| 43 || January 8 || Columbus Blue Jackets || 1–0 || || Kuemper || 18,573 || 23–14–6 || 52 || 
|- style="background:#fcc;"
| 44 || January 11 || @ Philadelphia Flyers || 3–5 || || Kuemper || 17,352 || 23–15–6 || 52 || 
|- style="background:#fcc;"
| 45 || January 14 || Philadelphia Flyers || 1–3 || || Kuemper || 18,573 || 23–16–6 || 52 || 
|- style="background:#cfc;"
| 46 || January 16 || @ New York Islanders || 4–3 || OT || Kuemper || 16,344 || 24–16–6 || 54 || 
|- style="background:#fcc;"
| 47 || January 17 || Minnesota Wild || 2–4 || || Lindgren || 18,573 || 24–17–6 || 54 || 
|- style="background:#cfc;"
| 48 || January 19 || @ Arizona Coyotes || 4–0 || || Kuemper || 4,600 || 25–17–6 || 56 || 
|- style="background:#fcc;"
| 49 || January 21 || @ Vegas Golden Knights || 2–6 || || Kuemper || 18,251 || 25–18–6 || 56 || 
|- style="background:#fcc;"
| 50 || January 24 || @ Colorado Avalanche || 2–3 || || Kuemper || 18,132 || 25–19–6 || 56 || 
|- style="background:#cfc;"
| 51 || January 26 || Pittsburgh Penguins || 3–2 || SO || Kuemper || 18,573 || 26–19–6 || 58 || 
|- style="background:#fcc;"
| 52 || January 29 || @ Toronto Maple Leafs || 1–5 || || Kuemper || 18,593 || 26–20–6 || 58 || 
|- style="background:#cfc;"
| 53 || January 31 || @ Columbus Blue Jackets || 4–3 || OT || Lindgren || 17,879 || 27–20–6 || 60 || 
|-

|- style="background:#cfc;"
| 54 || February 11 || @ Boston Bruins || 2–1 || || Kuemper || 17,850 || 28–20–6 || 62 || 
|- style="background:#fcc;"
| 55 || February 12 || San Jose Sharks || 1–4 || || Lindgren || 18,573 || 28–21–6 || 62 || 
|- style="background:#fcc;"
| 56 || February 14 || Carolina Hurricanes || 2–3 || || Kuemper || 18,573 || 28–22–6 || 62 || 
|- style="background:#fcc;"
| 57 || February 16 || Florida Panthers || 3–6 || || Kuemper || 18,573 || 28–23–6 || 62 || 
|- style="background:#fcc;"
| 58 || February 18 || @ Carolina Hurricanes || 1–4 || || Kuemper || 56,961(outdoors) || 28–24–6 || 62 || 
|- style="background:#fcc;"
| 59 || February 21 || Detroit Red Wings || 1–3 || || Kuemper || 18,573 || 28–25–6 || 62 || 
|- style="background:#fcc;"
| 60 || February 23 || Anaheim Ducks || 2–4 || || Lindgren || 18,573 || 28–26–6 || 62 || 
|- style="background:#cfc;"
| 61 || February 25 || New York Rangers || 6–3 || || Kuemper || 18,573 || 29–26–6 || 64 || 
|- style="background:#fcc;"
| 62 || February 26 || @ Buffalo Sabres || 4–7 || || Kuemper || 19,070 || 29–27–6 || 64 || 
|-

|- style="background:#cfc;"
| 63 || March 1 || @ Anaheim Ducks || 3–2 || OT || Kuemper || 14,279 || 30–27–6 || 66 || 
|- style="background:#cfc;"
| 64 || March 4 || @ San Jose Sharks || 8–3 || || Kuemper || 17,562 || 31–27–6 || 68 || 
|- style="background:#fcc;"
| 65 || March 6 || @ Los Angeles Kings || 2–4 || || Kuemper || 17,577 || 31–28–6 || 68 || 
|- style="background:#fff;"
| 66 || March 9 || New Jersey Devils || 2–3 || SO ||  Kuemper || 18,573 || 31–28–7 || 69 || 
|- style="background:#cfc;"
| 67 || March 11 || @ New York Islanders || 5–1 || ||  Kuemper || 17,255 || 32–28–7 || 71 || 
|- style="background:#fcc;"
| 68 || March 14 || @ New York Rangers || 3–5 || || Kuemper || 17,476 || 32–29–7 || 71 || 
|- style="background:#cfc;"
| 69 || March 15 || Buffalo Sabres || 5–4 || SO || Lindgren || 18,573 ||  33–29–7 || 73 || 
|- style="background:#;"
| 70 || March 17 || St. Louis Blues ||  || ||  ||  ||  ||  ||
|- style="background:#;"
| 71 || March 19 || @ Minnesota Wild ||  || ||  ||  ||  ||  ||
|- style="background:#;"
| 72 || March 21 || Columbus Blue Jackets ||  || ||  ||  ||  ||  ||
|- style="background:#;"
| 73 || March 23 || Chicago Blackhawks ||  || ||  ||  ||  ||  ||
|- style="background:#;"
| 74 || March 25 || @ Pittsburgh Penguins ||  || ||  ||  ||  ||  ||
|- style="background:#;"
| 75 || March 29 || New York Islanders ||  || ||  ||  ||  ||  ||
|- style="background:#;"
| 76 || March 30 || @ Tampa Bay Lightning ||  || ||  ||  ||  ||  ||
|-

|- style="background:#;"
| 77 || April 2 || New York Rangers ||  || ||  ||  ||  ||  ||
|- style="background:#;"
| 78 || April 6 || @ Montreal Canadiens ||  || ||  ||  ||  ||  ||
|- style="background:#;"
| 79 || April 8 || Florida Panthers ||  || ||  ||  ||  ||  ||
|- style="background:#;"
| 80 || April 10 || New York Islanders ||  || ||  ||  ||  ||  ||
|- style="background:#;"
| 81 || April 11 || @ Boston Bruins ||  || ||  ||  ||  ||  ||
|- style="background:#;"
| 82 || April 13 || New Jersey Devils ||  || ||  ||  ||  ||  ||
|-

|-
|

Roster

Transactions
The Capitals have been involved in the following transactions during the 2022–23 season.

Key:

 Contract is entry-level.
 Contract initially takes effect in the 2023–24 season.

Trades

Notes:
 Capitals retain 50% of Orlov's salary.
 Capitals retain 31% of Eller's salary.

Players acquired

Players lost

Signings

Draft picks
Below are the Washington Capitals' selections at the 2022 NHL Entry Draft, which was held on July 7 to 8, 2022, at Bell Centre in Montreal.

References 

Washington Capitals seasons
Capitals
Washington Capitals
Washington Capitals